The French destroyer Enseigne Roux was the name ship of her class of three destroyers built for the French Navy during the First World War.

Design and description
The Enseigne Roux class were an enlarged version of the preceding . They displaced  at normal load. Their crew numbered 76–81 men.

The ships were powered by a pair of Parsons steam turbines, each driving one propeller shaft using steam provided by four water-tube boilers.

The primary armament of the Enseigne Roux-class ships consisted of two  Modèle 1893 guns in single mounts, one each fore and aft of the superstructure, and four  Modèle 1902 guns distributed amidships. They were also fitted with two twin mounts for  torpedo tubes amidships.

Construction and career

Enseigne Roux was ordered from the Arsenal de Rochefort and was laid down on 13 December 1913. The ship was launched on 13 July 1915 and completed the following year. She spent the war assigned to the Dunkirk Flotilla, defending the English Channel.

Citations

References

 
 

1915 ships
Enseigne Roux-class destroyers
Ships built in France